IMImobile Limited was acquired by Cisco Systems in February 2021. The company provides cloud communications software and services that manage business-critical customer interactions at scale. IMImobile PLC traded on the London Stock Exchange’s AIM market with the TIDM code IMO. The company has offices in the UK, USA, Canada, India and South Africa and over 1,100 employees worldwide.

History
In 1999, IMImobile was established. In 2010, the company acquired AIM listed WIN PLC.

IMImobile was admitted to the AIM market of the London Stock Exchange on 27 June 2014. The company has then acquired a series of small-medium businesses: Textlocal in October 2014 (UK business messaging for SMBs), Archer Digital, now rebranded to IMImobile South Africa, in September 2015 (a provider of multi-media messaging in South Africa), Infracast, now rebranded to IMImobile Intelligent Networks, in March 2017 (provider of A2P messaging to banks and telecom operators in UK & Germany), Sumotext in November 2017, Healthcare Communications in December 2017 (provider of appointment management and patient experience communications in the UK), a Canadian Business, Impact Mobile in July 2018, and in August 2019, an American B2B text-engagement and RCS front runner, 3Cinteractive.

In December 2020, Cisco Systems announced its intention to acquire IMImobile PLC in a $730M deal. The deal was completed in February 2021.

References

British companies established in 1999
Software companies based in London
Software companies established in 1999
Telecommunications companies established in 1999
Software companies of England
Telecommunications companies of the United Kingdom
Cisco Systems acquisitions
2021 mergers and acquisitions
British subsidiaries of foreign companies
Companies formerly listed on the London Stock Exchange